Peirce is a small lunar impact crater in the western part of Mare Crisium. That dark, circular lunar mare is located in the east-northeasterly part of the Moon's near side. It was named after the American mathematician Benjamin Peirce. Peirce lies to the north of the craters Yerkes and Picard, and southeast of Macrobius located outside the mare. Just over a crater diameter to the north of Peirce is the smaller Swift. To the northwest is the wrinkle ridge Dorsum Oppel.

The rim of Peirce is roughly circular, with a slight outward bulge along the northwestern rim. There are indications of slumping along the sides of this section, producing a wider inner wall. It is generally bowl-shaped, and is marked only by a tiny craterlet along the inner southeast rim. The interior is marked by several furrows, ridges, as well as a low, conical hill near the midpoint.

Satellite craters
By convention these features are identified on lunar maps by placing the letter on the side of the crater midpoint that is closest to Peirce.

The following craters have been renamed by the IAU.

 Peirce B — See Swift (lunar crater).

References

External links
 LTO-44D4 Peirce — L&PI topographic map
 Peirce Crater: Apollo 17 vs. Lunar Orbiter 4 (accessed 10/04/05.)

Impact craters on the Moon